Loving is a 1945 novel by British writer Henry Green. Time included the novel in its TIME 100 Best English-language Novels from 1923 to 2005. One of his most admired works, Loving describes life above and below stairs in an Irish country house during the Second World War. In the absence of their employers the Tennants, the servants enact their own battles and conflict amid rumours about the war in Europe; invading one another's provinces of authority to create an anarchic environment of self-seeking behaviour, pilfering, gossip and love.

In a 1958 interview in The Paris Review, Terry Southern asked Green about his inspiration for Loving. Green replied: "I got the idea of Loving from a manservant in the Fire Service during the war. He was serving with me in the ranks, and he told me he had once asked the elderly butler who was over him what the old boy most liked in the world. The reply was: 'Lying in bed on a summer morning, with the window open, listening to the church bells, eating buttered toast with cunty fingers.' I saw the book in a flash."

Television film
An adaptation for a television film by Maggie Wadey was produced by the BBC and screened in 1996. It starred Mark Rylance and Georgina Cates.

References

1945 British novels
British novels adapted into films
British novels adapted into television shows
Novels by Henry Green
Novels set in Ireland
Novels set during World War II
Hogarth Press books